The High Commissioner of Australia to Fiji is an officer of the Australian Department of Foreign Affairs and Trade and the head of the High Commission of the Commonwealth of Australia in Fiji. The position has the rank and status of an Ambassador Extraordinary and Plenipotentiary and is currently vacant, with the head of mission being John Williams as acting high commissioner and Chargé d’Affaires since 1 September 2022. The High Commissioner is also Australia's Permanent Representative to the Pacific Islands Forum Secretariat, which is headquartered in Suva.

Posting history

On 29 November 1963, the Minister for External Affairs, Sir Garfield Barwick, announced the establishment of an Australian Commission in Suva to represent Australian interests in the Colony of Fiji, with R. N. Hamilton taking up the office of commissioner. With the independence of Fiji on 10 October 1970, the Australian Commission was upgraded to a high commission. On 29 November 1970, Birch was appointed as Australia's first non-resident accredited High Commissioner to Tonga, visiting Tonga on 3 December 1970 to present his letters of commission to the King of Tonga. On 13 December 1970, Birch was appointed as the non-resident accredited High Commissioner to Western Samoa. The high commissioner would have responsibility for relations with Tonga and Western Samoa until resident high commissions were established in Nukuʻalofa in 1980, and Apia in October 1979. 

Prior to the independence of Tuvalu on 1 October 1978, the High Commission was accredited to the country, with the high commissioner (1977–2014) and deputy high commissioner (2014–2018) also serving as the non-resident accredited high commissioner to Tuvalu. A resident High Commissioner to Tuvalu was appointed in 2018, and the High Commission was officially opened in 2019.

Following the coups of 1987 by the military and Sitiveni Rabuka, the declaration of Fiji as a republic on 10 October 1987, and the resignation of Sir Penaia Ganilau as Governor-General of Fiji on 15 October 1987, foreign minister Bill Hayden announced that the Australian High Commissioner to Fiji, John Piper, would be recalled for "consultations". With Fiji's membership in the Commonwealth of Nations considered to have lapsed, when the next Australian representative to Fiji was appointed in 1988, it was as "Ambassador" rather than high commissioner. When a new constitution was promulgated in July 1997, Fiji was readmitted to the Commonwealth from 1 October 1997 and the office once again was titled "High Commissioner". In 1991 the Australian Government acquired a 3.7 hectare site in Suva for the construction of a new embassy chancery, ambassador's residence, and facilities/residences for staff. The works were commissioned in 1992–1993, with the chancery designed by Australian Construction Services, and the original circa 1900 Ambassador's residence refurbished to a design by Adrian Sofield Architect.

Following a military coup in December 2006, relations between Australia and Fiji grew increasingly strained. On 3 November 2009, Fijian military leader and interim Prime Minister, Frank Bainimarama, declared the Australian and New Zealand high commissioners as Persona non grata, and high commissioner James Batley was recalled. In July 2012, the governments agreed to again exchange high commissioners, ending the three-year gap, with an Australian High Commissioner commencing in December 2014 following the first elections in the country held since 2006 in September 2014.

Heads of mission

Notes
 Also non-resident High Commissioner of Australia to Western Samoa, 1970–1979.
 Also non-resident High Commissioner of Australia to Tonga, 1970–1979.
 Also non-resident High Commissioner of Australia to Tuvalu, 1977–2014.
 Also non-resident High Commissioner of Australia to Nauru, 1998–2010.
 Also Permanent Representative of Australia to the Pacific Islands Forum, since 2014.

References

External links

Australian High Commission, Fiji

 
 
Fiji
Australia
Australia